Kingston is an unincorporated community and coal town in Fayette County, West Virginia, United States.

Kingston was named in 1910 by mining officials.

References

Unincorporated communities in Fayette County, West Virginia
Unincorporated communities in West Virginia
Coal towns in West Virginia